Stapelia gigantea is a species of flowering plant in the genus Stapelia of the family Apocynaceae. Common names include Zulu giant, carrion plant and toad plant (although the nickname "carrion plant" can also refer to Stapelia grandiflora). The plant is native to the desert regions of South Africa to Tanzania.Description
They bloom in autumn, triggered by the shorter daylight hours.

The flowers have the smell of rotting flesh, in order to attract the flies which pollinate them. Scent compounds of carrion flowers responsible for their odour include diamines (putrescine and cadaverine), sulfur compounds and various phenolic molecules. Because of the foul odor of its flower, S. gigantea can act as an appetite suppressant in humans.

There have been several proposed reasons for the size of the flowers of S. gigantea. First, it is possible that they are large to attract the flies that pollinate them. The large size and color of the flowers combined with the carrion smell may cause the flies to behave as if it is a dead carcass and be more likely to visit it.

Cultivation
Since it does not tolerate temperatures below  for extended periods, this plant must be grown under glass in temperate zones. It has gained the Royal Horticultural Society's Award of Garden Merit.

EcologyS. gigantea'' can become an invasive plant when introduced in arid and semi-arid environments, although it has been found to facilitate the recruitment of nurse-dependent native taxa, those that require a suitable microhabitat created by another plant for successful germination, growth, and/or survival from impacts such as herbivory.

Gallery

References

gigantea
Taxa named by N. E. Brown